Oak Park Heights is a city in Washington County, Minnesota, United States. The population was 4,849 at the 2020 census.

History
Formerly called simply Oak Park, the city was platted in 1857.  The 1932 Log Cabin restaurant and 1939 Stillwater Overlook are listed on the National Register of Historic Places.

Geography

Oak Park Heights is located adjacent to the city of Stillwater. Minnesota State Highways 5, 36 and 95 are three of the main routes in the community.

Demographics

2010 census
As of the census of 2010, there were 4,339 people, 1,842 households, and 980 families living in the city. The racial makeup of the city was 89.8% White, 4.5% African American, 1.6% Native American, 2.0% Asian, 0.5% from other races, and 1.5% from two or more races. Hispanic or Latino of any race were 3.0% of the population.

There were 1,842 households, of which 23.1% had children under the age of 18 living with them, 40.7% were married couples living together, 8.5% had a female householder with no husband present, 4.1% had a male householder with no wife present, and 46.8% were non-families. 42.6% of all households were made up of individuals, and 24.4% had someone living alone who was 65 years of age or older. The average household size was 2.06 and the average family size was 2.83.

The median age in the city was 44.9 years. 17.8% of residents were under the age of 18; 8% were between the ages of 18 and 24; 24.3% were from 25 to 44; 27% were from 45 to 64; and 23% were 65 years of age or older. The gender makeup of the city was 52.1% male and 47.9% female.

2000 census
As of the census of 2000, there were 3,957 people, 1,528 households, and 921 families living in the city. The racial makeup of the city was 91.03% White, 4.42% African American, 0.91% Native American, 1.29% Asian, 0.03% Pacific Islander, 0.63% from other races, and 1.69% from two or more races. Hispanic or Latino of any race were 2.10% of the population.

There were 1,528 households, out of which 30.6% had children under the age of 18 living with them, 45.7% were married couples living together, 10.1% had a female householder with no husband present, and 39.7% were non-families. 34.8% of all households were made up of individuals, and 16.2% had someone living alone who was 65 years of age or older. The average household size was 2.26 and the average family size was 2.94.

In the city, the population was spread out, with 21.8% under the age of 18, 9.1% from 18 to 24, 34.4% from 25 to 44, 21.8% from 45 to 64, and 12.8% who were 65 years of age or older. The median age was 36 years. For every 100 females, there were 117.5 males.  For every 100 females age 18 and over, there were 119.3 males.

The median income for a household in the city was $48,425, and the median income for a family was $69,485. Males had a median income of $46,558 versus $30,788 for females. The per capita income for the city was $23,293. About 2.1% of families and 3.4% of the population were below the poverty line, including 2.9% of those under age 18 and 6.2% of those age 65 or over.

References

Cities in Minnesota
Cities in Washington County, Minnesota